Carla Toscano de Balbín (born 14 November 1977 in Madrid) is a Spanish politician and a member of the Congress of Deputies for the Vox since May 2019.

Biography
Balbín was born and raised in Madrid. She attended the Complutense University of Madrid where she studied for a degree in law followed by a master's degree in linguistics. She then worked in the field of humanitarian aid before entering politics.

During the April 2019 Spanish general election, Balbín was elected to the Congress of Deputies for the Madrid constituency. She was re-elected in the general election of November 2019. Politically, she has framed her beliefs as " family, freedom, patriotism." Within Vox, she has served as the party's spokeswoman on gender issues and equality. In this role, she has denounced the Spanish gender violence law and feminism, and has likened positive discrimination(the act of intentionally favoring a racial minority over a racial majority) to Marxism. She has also called on the Spanish government to scrap the gender violence law, arguing "violence has no sex" and claims the law enables false accusations against men. Along with other Vox politicians, she supports abolishing Spain's autonomous communities and calls for the recentralization of the country.

References 

1977 births
Living people
Members of the State Lawyers Corps
Members of the 13th Congress of Deputies (Spain)
Members of the 14th Congress of Deputies (Spain)
Vox (political party) politicians
21st-century Spanish lawyers
Spanish women in politics
Lawyers from Madrid
Spanish women lawyers